In enzymology, a bromoxynil nitrilase is an enzyme that catalyzes the chemical reaction

3,5-dibromo-4-hydroxybenzonitrile + 2 H2O  3,5-dibromo-4-hydroxy-benzoate + NH3

Thus, the two substrates of this enzyme are 3,5-dibromo-4-hydroxybenzonitrile and H2O, whereas its two products are 3,5-dibromo-4-hydroxy-benzoate and NH3.

This enzyme belongs to the family of hydrolases, those acting on carbon-nitrogen bonds other than peptide bonds, specifically in nitriles.  The systematic name of this enzyme class is 3,5-dibromo-4-hydroxybenzonitrile aminohydrolase. This enzyme participates in 1,4-dichlorobenzene degradation.

References

 

EC 3.5.5
Enzymes of unknown structure